Sean Grieshop (born November 23, 1998) is an American competitive swimmer. Grieshop swam for Nitro Swimming in Texas, and after setting numerous National Age Group records, he now swims for the University of California Berkeley Golden Bears. At the 2014 Junior Pan Pacific Swimming Championships, he won the bronze medal in the 1500 meter freestyle with a time of 15:29.87. While competing at the 2015 World Junior Championships, he set his first Junior World Record in the 4 × 200 m freestyle relay with teammates Grant Shoults, Maxime Rooney, and Grant House. At the same meet, he won the gold medal in the 400m individual medley as well as bronze in the 200m individual medley.

At the 2016 U.S. Olympic Trials, Grieshop set his first individual Junior World Record in the 400 individual medley with a time of 4:14.00. In August, at the 2016 Junior Pan Pacific Swimming Championships in Maui, Hawaii, he won the gold medal in the 400 meter individual medley with a 4:16.05 and a silver medal in the 4×200 meter freestyle relay with a final relay time of 7:22.73, contributing a split time of 1:50.76 for the fourth leg of the relay.

In 2018, Grieshop qualified for the Pan Pacific Championships in the 400 Individual Medley.

In 2019, Grieshop placed 2nd in the 400 IM at the World University Games.

In 2021, Grieshop placed 16th in the 400 IM at the US Olympic Trials.

He has been named to the United States National Team (USA Swimming) for 3 consecutive years.

References

External links 
 
 
 Sean Grieshop at SwimSwam

1998 births
Living people
American male medley swimmers
Universiade medalists in swimming
Universiade gold medalists for the United States
Universiade silver medalists for the United States
American male freestyle swimmers
California Golden Bears men's swimmers
Medalists at the 2019 Summer Universiade
21st-century American people